Shimkus is a phonetic spelling of  the Lithuanian surname Šimkus, derived from the name Simon, and may refer to:

 Carley Shimkus (born 1986), American television journalist
 Frank Andrews Shimkus (born 1952), American retired broadcaster and politician
 Joanna Shimkus (born 1943), Canadian former actress, wife of American actor Sidney Poitier
 John Shimkus (born 1958), American politician

See also
Similar surnames:
Shimko
Shimek (disambiguation)

References